The following are international rankings of :

Agriculture
 The Economist: Global Food Security Index, ranked 19th out of 113 in 2017

Economy

 International Monetary Fund: GDP (nominal) 2022, ranked 28th out of 216 countries
 International Monetary Fund: GDP (nominal) per capita 2022, ranked 14th out of 192 countries
 Bloomberg L.P.: Innovation Index 2019, ranked 5th out of 95 countries
 Observatory of Economic Complexity, MIT: Economic Complexity Index 2018, ranked 20th out of 133 countries
 The Wall Street Journal and the Heritage Foundation: Index of Economic Freedom 2022, ranked 43rd out of 177 countries
 World Economic Forum: Global Competitiveness Index2019 ranked 20th out of 141 countries
 Grant Thornton: Global Dynamism Index 2020, ranked 2nd out of 60
 World Economic Forum: Human Capital Report 2017, ranked 18th out of 130
 World Economic Forum: Inclusive Development Index 2018, ranked 31st out of 103 countries
 World Bank: Ease of doing business index 2020, (2019 rankings), ranked 35th out of 190 countries
 World Bank: Logistics Performance Index 2016, ranked 28th out of 160

Education

 Organisation for Economic Co-operation and Development 2015 Programme for International Student Assessment, ranked 39th of 72 in mathematics, 39th of 72 in science, 37th of 72 in reading. The test does not affect the students' grades.

Environment 

 SOPAC: 2012, ranked 210th out of 234 countries
 Yale University/Columbia University: Environmental Performance Index, 2018, ranked 19th out of 180
 Third most dependent in the world on the Population Matters overshoot index after Singapore and Kuwait.

Free Speech 
 The Economist: Democracy Index, Freedom of Speech and the Media, ranked a shared 11th place out of 167 countries in the world (9 out of 10 points) in 2017.

Geography

 Total area ranked 153rd out of 249 countries (Includes Golan Heights and East Jerusalem, excludes West Bank).

Globalization

 KOF Index of Globalization 2018 (2015 data), ranked 37th out of 185
 Maastricht Globalisation Index 2012, ranked 14th out of 117
 Good Country Index v1.2, ranked 53rd out of 163
 Henley & Partners Passport Index, ranked 23rd out of 104 (or 49 out of 199 countries)

Human development and society
 Human Development Index: 0.919, ranked 25th out of 189.
Inequality-adjusted Human Development Index: 0.815, ranked 29th out of 152.
United Nations Development Programme: Human Development Index 2016, ranked 19th out of 188
 New World Wealth: Global Wealth Migration Review, Women's Safety 2017, ranked 8th
 World Happiness Report 2022, ranked 9th out of 156
 The Economist: Where-to-be-born Index 2013, ranked 20th out of 80
 State of World Liberty Project: State of World Liberty Index 2016, ranked 54th out of 185
 Global AgeWatch Index 2015, ranked 18th out of 96
 World Economic Forum: Global Gender Gap Report 2017, ranked 44th out of 144
 Legatum Prosperity Index 2017, ranked 38th out of 149
 Y&R BAV Group, Best Countries Report 2018, ranked 30th out of 80
 Social Progress Index 2017, ranked 29th out of 128
 OECD Better Life Index 2017, ranked 24th out of 38

Media

 Reporters Without Borders: 2016 Press Freedom Index, ranked 101st out of 180 national entities (includes Israeli-controlled territories)

Military

Institute for Economics and Peace Global Peace Index, 2017, ranked 144th out of 163
 Fund for Peace: Fragile States Index, 2017 (includes West Bank), 69th out of 178
 Globalfirepower.com Power Index 2017, ranked 15th out of 133

Politics

 Transparency International: 2016 Corruption Perceptions Index, ranked 28th out of 176 countries
 The Economist: Democracy Index 2020: ranked as a 'Flawed Democracy', 27th out of 167.
 Democracy Ranking 2016 (2014–15 data), ranked 26th out of 112

Technology

 Economist Intelligence Unit: E-readiness 2008, ranked 27th out of 70 countries
 United Nations: E-Government Survey 2016, ranked 20th out of 193
 WIPO: Global Innovation Index 2019, ranked 10th out of 129 countries
 Bloomberg Innovation Index 2015, ranked 5th out of 50
 Futron: Space Competitiveness Index 2012, ranked 9th in the world
 Akamai Technologies: State of the Internet Report, Q1 2017, ranked 28–30 out of 74 countries by average connection speed, 6 out of 74 by average peak speed

Tourism

 World Economic Forum: Travel and Tourism Competitiveness Report 2017, ranked 61 out of 136
 UNWTO: World Tourism rankings 2015, ranked 53 out of 141
 InterNations Expat Insider Survey 2019, ranked 14 out of 64

References

Israel